Procolophon (from  , 'before' and  , 'summit') is a genus of lizard-like procolophonid parareptiles that first appeared in the Early Triassic (Induan) of South Africa, Brazil, and Antarctica. It persisted through the Permian–Triassic extinction event, but went extinct in the beginning of the Early Middle Triassic. The type species is P. trigoniceps.

History of discovery 
The first Procolophon fossil was discovered in the 1870s in Donnybrook, an area southwest of Pietermaritzburg in present-day Kwa-Zulu Natal of South Africa. The fossil was accessioned to Harry Seeley, who described the fossil in 1878. Numerous other fossils have been recovered since from localities across the Eastern Cape and Free State provinces of South Africa.

Description 
 
The skull of Procolophon is distinct because of its latero-posteriorly facing paired cheek spikes, along with spiked dermal ossicles. Paleontologists debate the function of the cheek spikes. Some paleontologists posit that the bony protrusions were points for muscle attachments. Procolophon also had large eyes, and may have had acute night vision. Its teeth were peg-like and suitable for crushing plant matter. The front of the skull was short and blunt with the nasal opening very close to the mouth.

Classification 
Procolophon is a basal member of Procolophonidae, a clade of parareptiles that are closely related to larger, more derived parareptiles such as the pareiasaur, Bradysaurus. Procolophonids are also related to mesosaurids and millerettids. Procolophon is also considered to share a sister-taxon relationship with Tichvinskia, a procolophonid from the lower Triassic of Russia.

Correlation 
Procolophon occupied a wide geographic range. Fossils of the genus were found in the Lystrosaurus Assemblage Zone of the Katberg and Normandien Formations of South Africa, to the Sanga do Cabral Formation of the Paraná Basin in eastern Brazil, to the Fremouw Formation of the Transantarctic Mountains. Numerous subspecies and sister taxa are also found in the lower Triassic (Induan) of Germany, North America, and Russia.

References 

Procolophonines
Permian reptiles
Triassic parareptiles
Lopingian first appearances
Late Triassic extinctions
Late Triassic reptiles of Africa
Triassic South Africa
Fossils of South Africa
Beaufort Group
Prehistoric reptiles of Antarctica
Triassic Antarctica
Fossils of Antarctica
Triassic reptiles of South America
Triassic Brazil
Fossils of Brazil
Paraná Basin
Fossil taxa described in 1876
Taxa named by Richard Owen
Prehistoric reptile genera